Faria is both a surname and a given name.

Faria may also refer to:

Places
Faria (Barcelos), parish in the municipality of Barcelos, Portugal
Faria, California, also known as Faria Beach, unincorporated community in Ventura County, California
Paulo de Faria, municipality in the state of São Paulo, Brazil

Other uses
Faria Elementary School, a public school in Cupertino, California
Faria: A World of Mystery and Danger, a video game produced by the Game Arts for the Nintendo Entertainment System
Faria River, river in the state of Paraná, Brazil
Castle of Faria, castle in the parish of Gilmonde, Barcelos, Portugal

See also
 Farrier (disambiguation)
 Feria (disambiguation)